Yehezkel Streichman (1906 – January 12, 1993) was an Israeli painter.  He is considered a pioneer of Israeli modernist painting.  Among the awards that he won were the Dizengoff Prize and the Israel Prize.

Biography

Yehezkel Streichman was born in Kovno, Russian Empire (now Lithuania).  He studied at the local gymnasium, was a member of Hashomer Hatza'ir, and emigrated to Palestine in 1924.

Art career
Streichman studied at the Bezalel Academy of Art and Design with Arie Aroch in 1924–27. He then completed his studies in Paris at the École des Beaux-Arts (1927) and in Florence at the Academy of Art (1928–31).  He taught painting throughout his life; in elementary and high schools in 1936, at Kibbutz Ashdot Yaakov in 1941, and at the Avni Institute in Tel Aviv in 1944 and from 1954–79.  Among those who studied with him were Israeli sculptor Dani Karavan and Israeli abstract artist Lea Nikel, also the painter Yehuda Neiman .

He and Avigdor Stematsky formed the Studia Art School in 1944. In 1964, he and Yechiel Shemi and other artists formed a group of artists called Tatzpit (Vantage Point).

He participated in 24th Venice Biennale (1948), the 28th Venice Biennale (1954), the 3rd Sao Paulo Biennale (1955), and the 33rd Venice Biennale (1966). He was President of the Israeli Artists and Painters Union.

Style
His painting style involved using successive thick layers of paint.  He was an acclaimed painter in what was known as the modernist "New Horizons" (Ofakim Hadashim) group in 1950s Tel Aviv, which he founded in 1948 along with Joseph Zaritsky and Stematsky.  It painted in a French "lyrical abstraction" style.

Awards and recognition
Streichman won the Dizengoff Prize multiple times (1941, 1944, 1954, 1969), the Ramat Gan Prize (1956), the Moadon Milo Prize (1968), the Sandberg Prize for Israeli Art, awarded by the Israel Museum (1974), the Histadrut Prize (1986), the Israel Prize (1990).
In 1948 he participated in 24th Venice Biennale. During the years 1941–44 he was a member of Kibbutz Ashdot Ya'akov. During 1945–48 he founded The Studio in Tel Aviv with Stematsky. In 1948 Streichman was one of the founders of New Horizon Group. In 1981 he was made an Honorary citizen of Tel Aviv and in 1992 Honorary President of the Association of Artists and sculptors.

He died on January 12, 1993, in Tel Aviv, at the age of 86.

A street in the Nofei Yam neighborhood of Tel Aviv is named after him in acknowledgment of his contributions to the arts.

Solo exhibitions

Published works
Yehezkel Streichman: paintings: 1942–1975, Muze'on Tel Aviv (1975)
Yehezkel Streichman: paintings: March–April 1974, Volume 117 of The Israel Museum, Jerusalem, Yona Fischer (1981)
Yehezkel Streichman: watercolours: Tel Aviv, Museum of Art, Yehezkel Streichman, Museum of Art (1989)
Yehezkel Streichman: recent work: the Open Museum, Industrial Park, Tefen, winter 1991, Yehezkiel Streichman, Nathan Zach, Richard Flantz, Avraham Hai, Muzeon ha-patuah (Migdal Tefen), Open Museum – Tefen Industrial Park (1991)
Streichman, Yona Fischer, Yehezkel Streichman, Israel Phoenix and Yehezkel Streichman Estate (1997)

See also
List of Israel Prize recipients
Israeli art
Yehezkel Streichman's paintings on Tiroche.

References

External links 
 
 
 

1906 births
1993 deaths
Lithuanian Jews
20th-century Israeli Jews
Lithuanian emigrants to Mandatory Palestine
Israeli artists
Israeli painters
Artists from Kaunas
Bezalel Academy of Arts and Design alumni
Israel Prize in painting recipients
Sandberg Prize recipients
Hashomer Hatzair members